Stanisław Miaskowski Tenement is a historical house located at 40 Gdańska Street, in downtown Bydgoszcz, Poland.

Location
The building stands on the eastern side of Gdańska Street, between Krasinski and Słowackiego streets. It is adjacent to the Max Rosenthal tenement, another historical building in Bydgoszcz.

History
The house was built in 1852 for Stanisław Von Miaskowski, an art dealer.
At this time, the street was not the present thoroughfare: the address of the house was Danziger Chaussee 10, Bromberg: Bydgoszcz was then part of northern Prussia.

In the 1880s, Von Miaskowski began renting out the building. During this same time the avenue took the name of Danzigerstraße, thus signifying its growing importance in the city network.

Architecture 
This building is one of the oldest preserved in its original form on Gdańska Street, dating back from the mid-19th century.

In the backyard of the house is growing a 150 year old yew tree, one of the oldest in the city.

See also

 Bydgoszcz
 Gdanska Street in Bydgoszcz
  Downtown district in Bydgoszcz

References

Bibliography 
  

Buildings and structures on Gdańska Street, Bydgoszcz
Houses completed in 1852
Villas in Bydgoszcz
1852 establishments in Prussia
1852 establishments in Germany